Ryazany is a rural locality (a village) in Klyapovskoye Rural Settlement, Beryozovsky District, Perm Krai, Russia. The population was 10 as of 2010.

Geography 
Ryazany is located on the Barda River, 34 km east of  Beryozovka (the district's administrative centre) by road. Zernino is the nearest rural locality.

References 

Rural localities in Beryozovsky District, Perm Krai